Resnik is a village in Požega-Slavonia County, Croatia. The village is administered as a part of the City of Pleternica.
According to national census of 2001, population of the village is 301. The village is connected by the D38 state road.

Sources

Populated places in Požega-Slavonia County